Sympecma is a genus of damselfly in the family Lestidae.

The genus contains the following species:

References

Lestidae
Zygoptera genera
Taxa named by Hermann Burmeister